The black-crowned pitta (Erythropitta ussheri), also known as the black-headed pitta, black-and-crimson pitta, black-and-scarlet pitta or black-crowned garnet pitta, is a brightly coloured, ground-dwelling, bird species in the pitta family. It is endemic to the Southeast Asian island of Borneo. It was described by John Gould in 1877, with the type locality recorded as the Lawas River in northern Sarawak.

Taxonomy
The pitta was formerly considered a subspecies of the garnet pitta but was split because of morphological and vocal differences as well as apparent parapatry. Lack of evidence of hybridisation suggests that the garnet and black-headed pittas are allospecies.

Description

An adult pitta is distinctively marked with a black head and breast contrasting with a crimson belly and prominent, pale blue, narrow raised stripes extending back from the eyes. The upperparts are dark purple-blue with an iridescent azure patch on the bend of the wing. The tip of the bill is bright red to orange. Nestlings are yellow with coral-red gapes and bill tips. Juveniles are uniformly dark brown until they begin to acquire adult plumage.

Behaviour

Breeding
The breeding season extends from early February to late July, the driest time of the year. The nest has been described as domed, built on a muddy bank on a pile of coarse sticks and bark, with a cup made of fine roots and leaves, and a roof of leaves. A clutch of two is laid; the eggs are white with blotches and spots of dark red and black.

Feeding
The pitta consumes a variety of largely invertebrate prey. Its diet includes spiders, ants, cockroaches, beetles and snails.

Voice

The call of the black-crowned pitta is similar to that of the garnet pitta in being characterised by a quiet whistle, lasting about four seconds, rising in both power and pitch. It differs in stopping less abruptly and in wavering slightly in mid-call.

Distribution and habitat

The pitta has only been recorded from the Malaysian state of Sabah in northern Borneo, where it occupies lowland tropical rainforests from sea level up to about 300 m, above which it is replaced by the blue-banded pitta. It prefers dark and damp places, especially ravines beneath dense cover. In prime habitat, such as the primary forest of the Danum Valley Conservation Area, recorded population densities are 21–22 pairs per square kilometre. It can also be found in areas that have been selectively logged as well as in overgrown rubber and Albizia plantations.

Status and conservation
The pitta is likely to have been affected by the rapid and sustained deforestation which has taken place in northern Borneo. Despite the ability of the species to persist in some degraded habitats, it is thought to have suffered a moderately rapid population decline, and is however classified as least concern.

References

black-crowned pitta
Endemic birds of Borneo
Birds of East Malaysia
black-crowned pitta
black-crowned pitta